Badyara is an Eastern Senegal-Guinea language of Guinea and Guinea-Bissau.

Variants of the name are Badara, Badian, Badjara, Badyaranké; there are also Jaad, Bigola, Gola, Kanjad [ka-njad(ɛ)]), Pajade, Pajadinka.

References

Fula–Tenda languages
Languages of Guinea
Languages of Guinea-Bissau